David Agudo Pérez (born 12 November 1988) is a Spanish footballer  who plays for Xerez Deportivo FC.

Club career
He made his Austrian Football First League debut for Kapfenberger SV on 21 July 2017 in a game against FC Liefering.

References

External links

1988 births
People from Tierra de Mérida - Vegas Bajas
Sportspeople from the Province of Badajoz
Living people
Spanish footballers
Association football forwards
Segunda División B players
CD Badajoz players
Lucena CF players
Betis Deportivo Balompié footballers
CD San Roque de Lepe footballers
CD Atlético Baleares footballers
CF Reus Deportiu players
Huracán Valencia CF players
CF Talavera de la Reina players
Extremadura UD footballers
UD Melilla footballers
CD Don Benito players
2. Liga (Austria) players
Kapfenberger SV players
Spanish expatriate footballers
Spanish expatriate sportspeople in Austria
Expatriate footballers in Austria